Admiral The Honourable Sir Matthew Robert Best  & Bar, MVO (18 June 1878 – 13 October 1940) was a Royal Navy officer who went on to be Commander-in-Chief, America and West Indies Station.

Early life
Best was born in Frampton, Dorset, on 18 June 1878, the fifth child and third son of George Best (later the 5th Baron Wynford) and his wife Edith Anne (née Marsh).

Naval career
Best joined the Royal Navy in 1892. He served in the First World War and fought at the Battle of Jutland in 1916 as Staff Officer to the Commander-in-chief of the Grand Fleet where he was awarded the Distinguished Service Order (DSO). He was appointed Commanding Officer of HMS Queen Elizabeth in 1919 and Commanding Officer  and Chief of Staff to the Commander-in-Chief of the Atlantic Fleet in 1927, before becoming Commander of the 2nd Cruiser Squadron in the Atlantic Fleet in 1929. He was appointed Admiral Superintendent of Malta Dockyard in 1931 and Commander-in-Chief, America and West Indies Station, based at the Royal Naval Dockyard Bermuda (with his shore residence at Admiralty House Bermuda), in 1934. He was promoted vice-admiral on 13 November 1932 and admiral on 19 June 1936.

He died with the rank of admiral in 1940 at Frampton in Dorset.

References

|-

1878 births
1940 deaths
Companions of the Distinguished Service Order
Knights Commander of the Order of the Bath
Members of the Royal Victorian Order
People from Dorset
Royal Navy admirals
Royal Navy officers of World War I
Younger sons of barons
Military personnel from Dorset